Paul Xandros Williams (February 19, 1908 – January 24, 1994) was a United States district judge of the United States District Court for the Western District of Arkansas.

Education and career

Born in Booneville, Arkansas, Williams received a Bachelor of Arts degree from the University of Arkansas in 1929 and a Bachelor of Laws from the University of Arkansas School of Law in 1930. He was in the United States Navy as a Lieutenant Commander from 1942 to 1946. He was an Assistant United States Attorney of the Western District of Arkansas from 1947 to 1948. He was a Chancellor of the Chancery Court of Arkansas from 1949 to 1967.

Federal judicial service

Williams was nominated by President Lyndon B. Johnson on May 24, 1967, to a seat on the United States District Court for the Western District of Arkansas vacated by Judge John E. Miller. He was confirmed by the United States Senate on June 12, 1967, and received his commission the same day. He served as Chief Judge from 1973 to 1981. He assumed senior status on October 31, 1981. Williams served in that capacity until his death on January 24, 1994, in Booneville.

References

Sources
 

1908 births
1994 deaths
Arkansas state court judges
Judges of the United States District Court for the Western District of Arkansas
United States district court judges appointed by Lyndon B. Johnson
20th-century American judges
University of Arkansas alumni
University of Arkansas School of Law alumni
United States Navy officers
People from Booneville, Arkansas